Kenneth Amponsah-Yiadom is a Ghanaian Politician and a member of the First Parliament of the Fourth Republic representing the
Offinso South Constituency in the Ashanti Region of Ghana. He represented the National Democratic Congress.

Early life and education
Kenneth Amponsah-Yiadom was born in Offinso in the Ashanti Region of Ghana. He attended Prempeh College and the University of Ghana where he obtained a bachelor's degree in Political Science and a Postgraduate diploma in Library Science.

Politics
Kenneth Amponsah-Yiadom was first elected into parliament on the ticket of the National Democratic Congress as a member  of parliament for the Offinso South constituency in the Ashanti Region during the 1992 Ghanaian parliamentary election. He was defeated by Francis Kwasi Buor of the New Patriotic Party during the 1996 Ghanaian general election.

Career
He is a farmer and a librarian by profession and was a former member of parliament for the Offinso South Constituency in the Ashanti Region of Ghana from 1993 to 1997.

Personal life
He is a Christian.

References

Living people
University of Ghana alumni
National Democratic Congress (Ghana) politicians
Ghanaian MPs 1993–1997
Agriculturalists
Ghanaian Christians
People from Ashanti Region
Year of birth missing (living people)